Valeriia Olegovna Maslova (born 23 January 2001) is a Russian handball player for Metz Handball and the Russian national team.

International honours
Youth World Championship:
Gold Medalist: 2018

International career 
Maslova made her international debut for Russia on 31 May 2018, in a qualification game against Portugal. She represented Russia at the 2020 European Women's Handball Championship.

References

External links

2001 births
Living people
Sportspeople from Rostov-on-Don
Russian female handball players
Expatriate handball players
Russian expatriates in Montenegro